The Sunrise Comfort Station (S-310) is a comfort station in Mount Rainier National Park, Washington, USA. Built around 1930, the building was designed by Thomas Chalmers Vint of the National Park Service in association with landscape architect E.A. Davidson. The structure was part of a planned ensemble at what was then called Yakima Park, high on the northern flank of Mount Rainier. Similar structures may be found at the Ohanapecosh, Longmire and White River campgrounds in the park. The low building is framed in peeled logs on a stone foundation, set into a hillside and surrounded by native landscaping.

The "comfort station", otherwise known as a public toilet, was placed on the National Register of Historic Places on March 13, 1991.  It is part of the Mount Rainier National Historic Landmark District, which encompasses the entire park and which recognizes the park's inventory of Park Service-designed rustic architecture. Another comfort station (S-005) situated between the Yakima Park Stockade Group and the Sunrise Lodge is not part of that district but contributes to the Sunrise Historic District instead. S-310 does not.

See also
 Tipsoo Lake Comfort Station

References

National Register of Historic Places in Mount Rainier National Park
Government buildings completed in 1930
Buildings and structures in Pierce County, Washington
Rustic architecture in Washington (state)
Buildings and structures in Mount Rainier National Park
Park buildings and structures on the National Register of Historic Places in Washington (state)
Restrooms in the United States
1930 establishments in Washington (state)